Mavai-ye Olya (also Romanized as Mavāī-e ‘Olyā; also known as Ma‘vā'-e ‘Olyā and Ma‘vā-ye ‘Olyā) is a village in Qarah Su Rural District, in the Central District of Kermanshah County, Kermanshah Province, Iran. At the 2006 census, its population was 47, in 10 families.

References 

Populated places in Kermanshah County